Wonderbag is a stand-alone, non-electric insulated bag designed to reduce the amount of fuel required in the cooking of food in developing countries. Instead of being placed on a stove for the duration of the cooking period, food is instead heated to a hot enough temperature then transferred to the Wonderbag, which uses the principle of thermal insulation to continue cooking, and keeps food warm without needing additional fire or heat.  Working on the principle of thermal cooking, the Wonderbag is estimated to save up to 30% of the total fuel costs associated with cooking with Kerosene ("paraffin") alone. In developing countries there are numerous advantages for the product, as it immediately helps ease deforestation of natural reserves, and it frees up those who would spend their time gathering the extra wood for fire fuel.

Designed by Durban, South Africa-based entrepreneur Sarah Collins of Natural Balance, and poverty activist Moshy Mathe, the Wonderbag is aimed at societies where fuel is expensive or time-consuming to gather.

As of January 2012, over 150,000 Wonderbags were in use in South Africa, with the manufacturers and partners such as Unilever intending to promote the use of the device worldwide.  over 650,000 have been distributed in "South Africa, Rwanda, Kenya, and Syrian refugee camps in Jordan."

History 
Sarah Collins developed the idea for the Wonderbag during power outages in South Africa in 2008.

Anna Pearce describes in her book "Simply Living - The Story of the Compassion and the Wonderbox" from 1989 how the old idea of the hayboxes turned into polystyrene filled cushions - The Wonderbox - to cook in South Africa Wonderboxes were also distributed beginning as early as 1976, while not a new invention, the wonderbag is an innovative take on an old design.

The original Wonderbox was designed and produced by Shirley Buys (née Woodbridge) in Durban in 1976, based upon the Hay Box design used in her childhood in war-time England. Shirley trained as a patternmaker and designed the inverted oversized 'beanbag' containing recycled polystyrene chips in a polyester-cotton fabric bag and lid within a corrugated cardboard box and personally marketed it across Zululand between 1976 and 1980. Compassion of South Africa, a non-sectarian Christian action group opposing Apartheid, and the particular assistance from Brigid Oppenheimer facilitated Shirley's design and marketing and published a comprehensive recipe book  with a lot of graphics to help illiterate users follow the recipes. The design was deliberately not patented and Compassion of South Africa asked to be recognised in the sharing of the recipe book.  Shirley manufactured the Wonderbox in her workshop in her Morningside Durban home for over 3 years before Compassion established several other manufacturing facilities across South African, and shared the design freely.

Design 
The Wonderbag consists of an inner layer of insulation containing recycled polystyrene balls, with an outer, drawstring covering of polyester-cotton blend textiles. The manufacturers expect that in time the polystyrene (which is non-biodegradable) will be replaced with a polyurethane blend.

Use 
To use the Wonderbag, first a cooking pot is heated as normal on a stove until it reaches the required cooking temperature. At this point, the pot is removed from the stove and placed in the bag, where due to the insulation the receptacle remains near the stovetop temperature for an extended period. Rice, for instance, may be cooked by heating in a pot of water for two minutes until the water boils and then placing in the Wonderbag for another hour, while for a meat dish the stovetop time is twenty minutes and the bag time five hours.

Fuel savings 
Due to the reduction in fuel used, the Wonderbag is estimated to reduce carbon dioxide emissions by up to half a ton per year if used three times a week.

Retail and production 
The Wonderbag is not available in the United States.

References

External links 
 Official website

Cookware and bakeware
Sustainable technologies